The 1999 Tandridge District Council election took place on 6 May 1999 to elect members of Tandridge District Council in Surrey, England. One third of the council was up for election and the council stayed under no overall control.

After the election, the composition of the council was
Conservative 18
Liberal Democrat 17
Labour 7

Election result

Ward results

Nutfield ward changed from Liberal Democrat to Conservative in the 1998 by-election.
Therefore, this is shown as a gain from the 1995 election.

References

1999
1999 English local elections
1990s in Surrey